Nii Odartey Lamptey (born 10 December 1974) is a Ghanaian former professional footballer and current manager of Elmina Sharks as well as the proprietor of a school in Accra called Glow-Lamp International School. During his career he played as a striker from 1990 until 2008 notably for Anderlecht, for Aston Villa, PSV Eindhoven, Coventry City and the Ghana national football team.

He is known foremost for his erratic career, in which he became a superstar as a teenager and then suffered a long string of failures which burnt him out well before his time. Lamptey has been used as a byword for a cautionary tale of putting too much pressure on young players to be successful.

He also played for Anderlecht, Venezia, Boca Juniors, Unión Santa Fe, Ankaragücü, União Leiria, Greuther Fürth, Shandong Luneng, Al-Nassr, Asante Kotoko and Jomo Cosmos.

Early years
Nii Lamptey was born in Tema, but grew up in the two biggest Ghanaian cities, Accra and Kumasi. He had a miserable childhood, as his parents abused and neglected him. His father was an alcoholic who often beat and lashed him and sometimes burnt his body with cigarettes.  Lamptey often refused to spend the nights home and frequently skipped school, only finding refuge in football. Soon, he began to excel in this sport, despite his father heckling him and hurling verbal abuse from the sidelines whenever he watched his son play football.

When Lamptey was eight, his parents divorced, and his stepfather threw him out of the household. Lamptey found refuge in a Muslim football camp and converted from Christianity to Islam to qualify for entry.  When his stepfather found this out, he accused his stepson of sacrilege and often quarreled in front of the football camp.

Club career

Anderlecht
Lamptey played for the youth team Young Corners in Accra, but wanted to move abroad to play. However, the Ghanaian FA refused and confiscated his passport, wishing to build a team around him in Ghana. He therefore was smuggled into Nigeria by a taxi driver, where he met Nigerian captain Stephen Keshi, who had heard of his skills. Keshi persuaded Lamptey to play in Belgium with him, and took Lamptey with him, giving him a fake Nigerian passport that stated Lamptey was his son.

He was hailed as the new Pelé and age limit rules in Belgium were changed to allow him to debut at the age of 16 for Anderlecht.

His first season was a success, scoring 7 goals in 14 games.

PSV Eindhoven
He was loaned to Eindhoven, and quickly established himself as a prolific scorer, and continued to impress, scoring 10 times in 22 games.

Aston Villa
Ron Atkinson brought Lamptey to Aston Villa in the summer of 1994. This move came as a surprise, as PSV was a more successful club than Aston Villa at the time and Lamptey was one of the star players at PSV. However, Lamptey had signed an exclusive marketing contract with an Italian player agent. The player's agent, Antonio Caliendo, would get 25% of whatever Lamptey's transfer fee was, and accordingly sold him to Villa as that would mean the largest commission for himself. Lamptey's illiteracy allowed Caliendo to take advantage of him, even pocketing a signing on bonus intended for Lamptey. He failed to impress at Villa Park, scoring just three times, all of which came in the League Cup against Wigan Athletic (once in the home leg and twice in the away leg).

Coventry City
Following Atkinson's dismissal as Villa boss, he re-signed Lamptey for his new club Coventry City. Again Lamptey would score his only goals in the League Cup, netting twice against Hull City (once in the home leg and once in the away leg). However, despite his failure at Coventry, his name was not forgotten. From the start of the 2012–13 season, a group of Coventry City fans launched a podcast entitled The Nii Lamptey Show in honour of their former player.

Later career
Lamptey joined Venezia in Italy. Later, he was signed by Boca Juniors and went on loan at that same year at Unión de Santa Fe in Argentina. There, he and his wife had their third child, Diego. But soon, Diego died of a rare disease. A major emotional blow was also the fact that Lamptey wanted to bury his son in Ghana, but the authorities declined. Heartbroken, Lamptey temporarily gave up football. After unsuccessful stints at Ankaragücü and União Leiria, Lamptey got himself a new German player agent who transferred him to SpVgg Greuther Fürth. However, Lamptey and his wife were unhappy there, unable to live through the culture shock in Germany. Lamptey was not entirely unsuccessful, being a reliable backup, but was found too fragile for the rough 2. Bundesliga. He was also reportedly ignored by his German colleagues, and once, a colleague flat-out refused to sleep in the same hotel room as him. This blatant racism shocked Lamptey, but even worse was the fact that his child Lisa also died soon after birth. Also Lamptey's second dead child was buried abroad, in Germany. The Lampteys soon left for Asia.

Lamptey then joined Shandong Luneng Tai Shan in China.

On 5 March 2007, Lamptey signed for South African side Jomo Cosmos.

International career

Youth

1991 U-17 World Cup
Lamptey first began to attract global attention in 1991. He led Ghana to win the 1991 FIFA U-17 World Championship with the team known as the Black Starlets after playing in the 1989 version as a 15-year-old. He won the FIFA Best Player of the tournament – the Golden Ball award in a competition that also included Argentina's Juan Sebastian Verón and Marcelo Gallardo and Italy's Alessandro del Piero, Lamptey's star shone more brilliantly than them all, as he dominated everyone in the competition. He was subsequently touted as the next Pelé; by Pelé himself. He scored four goals in that tournament. Lamptey later stated that although appreciated, Pelé's praise made life far harder for him, since everyone therefore had extremely high expectations of him that he was not always able to fulfill.

The adidas Golden Ball could only go to one of the members of the victorious Ghanaian side, and so it was, with Lamptey taking home a very special souvenir from his Italian sojourn. Lamptey was the beating heart of a very good side. His fast feet, speed of thought, and clever interplay with captain Alex Opoku and fellow midfielders Mohammed Gargo and Emmanuel Duah were on display for all to see. His willingness to get into the box was critical too, and his four goals made him joint top-goalscorer.

In recognition of his exquisite football he displayed at the FIFA U-17 Tournament, he was named the 1991 fifth best African Footballer of the Year.

1993 U-20 World Cup
Lamptey's brilliance led an enterprising and unpredictable Ghana's U-20 team, known as the "Black Satellites" to win the  1993 African U-20 Cup of Nations and then lost the final of the 1993 FIFA World Youth Championship held in Australia to Brazil, who came from a goal down to win the trophy at the death, 2–1. He also scored in the match.

Summer Olympics
In the Summer of 1992, young superstar Nii Lamptey led Ghana to win a Bronze medal at the Barcelona 1992 Summer Olympics football tournament. Ghana, who had the youngest team by far in the competition (the average age of the squad was 18.8 years), were surprise bronze medallists, becoming the first African nation to earn a medal. They did so in a 1–0 victory over yet another surprise, Australia.

Senior
His international career with Ghana dried up after he was sent off in the 1996 African Cup of Nations semi-final game.

Retirement
Lamptey retired from football in 2008. He now breeds cattle and sheep on a farm on the outskirts of Accra. He served as a pundit on Ghanaian television during the 2014 World Cup.

He also founded Glow-lamp International School , so as to give back to society and ensure than children have the chance to learn to read and write: something he was never able to do. As of 2017, his school has almost 400 pupils. He also has a football academy he coaches at in Elmina.

Lamptey has said that despite everything, he does not feel like a loser, but rather as a hardened survivor who refuses to be destroyed, and whom God will not punish.

Personal life
Lamptey married Gloria Appiah in 1993. The marriage was a controversial one, angering his brothers, as Appiah is from a different tribe (Fante) to his (Ga). He had five children, of whom two died to lung diseases. However, a DNA test revealed he was not the biological father of the remaining three children and he divorced her. Appiah filed for an appeal in court, requesting 50% of his assets in the divorce including occupancy at the couple's East Legon apartment, but was refused by the judge.

As of 2016, Lamptey is engaged to actress and model Ruweida Yakuba with whom he has two children.

He has had a feud with Ghanaian star Abedi Pele, but refuses to disclose the reason.

Coaching career
On 19 February 2009 signed a contract as Assistant at Sekondi Wise Fighters; here he assisted the new Head Coach Charles Akonnor. He also owns a football academy in Elmina that he coaches at.

Honours
Anderlecht

 Belgian First Division: 1990–91, 1992–93

Asante Kotoko
 Ghana Premier League: 2005

Ghana U-17
 FIFA U-17 World Championship: 1991

Ghana U-20
 African U-20 Cup of Nations: 1993
 FIFA World Youth Championship runner-up: 1993

Ghana U-23
 1992 Summer Olympics: Bronze medal

References
Der afrikanische Pelé (the African Pelé), documentary by the German TV station WDR, on 14 April 2006

External links
 Nii Lamptey returns home
 A Look at Lamptey's Career 
 Boy wonder's lost years
 
 
 

1974 births
1992 African Cup of Nations players
1994 African Cup of Nations players
1996 African Cup of Nations players
2. Bundesliga players
Al-Nasr SC (Dubai) players
Asante Kotoko S.C. players
association football midfielders
Aston Villa F.C. players
Belgian Pro League players
Coventry City F.C. players
Elmina Sharks F.C. managers
Eredivisie players
Expatriate footballers in Argentina
Expatriate footballers in Belgium
Expatriate footballers in China
Expatriate footballers in England
Expatriate footballers in Germany
Expatriate footballers in Italy
Expatriate footballers in Portugal
Expatriate footballers in the Netherlands
Expatriate footballers in Turkey
Expatriate soccer players in South Africa
Footballers at the 1992 Summer Olympics
Ghana international footballers
Ghana under-20 international footballers
Ghanaian football managers
Ghanaian footballers
Ghanaian expatriate footballers
Ghanaian expatriate sportspeople in Belgium
Ghanaian expatriate sportspeople in China
Ghanaian expatriate sportspeople in Germany
Ghanaian expatriate sportspeople in Italy
Ghanaian expatriate sportspeople in Portugal
Ghanaian expatriate sportspeople in South Africa
Ghanaian expatriate sportspeople in the Netherlands
Ghanaian expatriate sportspeople in Turkey
Jomo Cosmos F.C. players
living people
medalists at the 1992 Summer Olympics
MKE Ankaragücü footballers
Olympic bronze medalists for Ghana
Olympic footballers of Ghana
Olympic medalists in football
people from Tema
Premier League players
PSV Eindhoven players
R.S.C. Anderlecht players
Sekondi Eleven Wise F.C. managers
Serie B players
Shandong Taishan F.C. players
SpVgg Greuther Fürth players
U.D. Leiria players
UAE Pro League players
Unión de Santa Fe footballers
Venezia F.C. players